Valyukevich is the name of:

 Gennadiy Valyukevich (1958–2019), Soviet triple jumper
 Irina Valyukevich (born 1959), Soviet long jumper, wife of Gennadiy
 Dmitrij Vaľukevič (born 1981), Belarusian-born Slovak triple jumper, son of Gennadiy and Irina
 Viktoriya Valyukevich (born 1982), Russian triple jumper, wife of Dmitrij